is a disused railway station on the Ōu Main Line in the city of Fukushima, Fukushima Prefecture, Japan, operated by East Japan Railway Company (JR East). Services ended on 4 March 2017. The station was discontinued on 13 March 2021.

Lines

Services
The station used to be served by six services in each direction daily, but beginning in December 2012, no trains stopped at the station during the winter period between December and March. The station was abolished on 13 March 2021.

Station layout
The station was unstaffed and consisted of an unnumbered island platform serving two tracks. The platform could be accessed from the station building via a level crossing.

Platforms

Adjacent stations

History
Akaiwa Station opened on 13 October 1910. The station was absorbed into the JR East network upon the privatization of Japanese National Railways (JNR) on 1 April 1987.

From 1 December 2012, trains stopped serving this station during the winter period (until 25 March 2013). Services stopped completely on 4 March 2017.

The station discontinued on 13 March 2021 due to timetable revision.

Surrounding area
The station was located in an isolated mountainous area on the Fukushima side of the Itaya Pass.

See also
 List of railway stations in Japan

References

External links

  

Stations of East Japan Railway Company
Railway stations in Fukushima Prefecture
Ōu Main Line
Railway stations in Japan opened in 1910
Fukushima (city)
Railway stations closed in 2021
Defunct railway stations in Japan
2021 disestablishments in Japan